Josef Heller was an Ethnic German luger who competed for Czechoslovakia in the mid-1930s. He a bronze medal in the men's doubles event at the 1934 European luge championships in Ilmenau, Germany.

References
 FIL-Luge.org list of European luge champions  - Accessed January 31, 2008.
 List of European luge champions 

Czechoslovak male lugers
German Bohemian people
Possibly living people
Year of birth missing
Czechoslovak people of German descent